was a general in the Imperial Japanese Army and 19th and final Japanese Governor-General of Taiwan from 30 December 1944 to October 1945.

Biography

Early career
Andō was a native of Miyagi Prefecture. He served as an instructor at the Army War College from 1924-1925. From 1925-1927, he was sent to British India as a military attaché, and on his return to Japan, served in a number of staff assignments under the Imperial Japanese Army General Staff. He returned to the field in 1928 as commander of the 13th Infantry Regiment, and was promoted to Chief of Staff of the IJA 5th Division in 1930.

From 1931-1932, Andō returned to the General Staff, where he was Chief of Military Administration Section, Military Affairs Bureau. He was appointed military attaché to the United Kingdom from 1932-1934. After his return to Japan, he became Commandant of the Toyoma Army Infantry School, and subsequently commander of the 5th Independent Garrison Unit. From 1937-1938, he was Deputy Inspector-General of Military Training.

The man who started the Pacific War
With the outbreak of the Second Sino-Japanese War, Andō was given a field assignment as commander of his old unit, the IJA 5th Division in 1938. Later that year, he was promoted to commander in chief of the IJA 21st Army in China, which became part of the Japanese Southern China Area Army in 1939. The Japanese Southern China Area Army was largely a garrison force controlling Japanese-occupied Guangdong and Guangxi Provinces.

In the midst of diplomatic negotiations between Japan and its ally, Vichy France over access to air strips and seaports in French Indochina, Andō took independent initiative and ordered his forces across the border, without prior authorization from the government in Tokyo. Japanese military and political leaders were outraged; however, as the invasion had already occurred, military and political considerations meant that the Japanese government had no choice but to follow through. The unauthorized invasion of French Indochina created a diplomatic confrontation with the West and the imposition of an American oil embargo against Japan. Andō was recalled to Tokyo on 9 February 1941 and forced into retirement as punishment.

Taiwan

In the fall of 1941, Andō was recalled to service, promoted to full general, and given command of the Japanese Tenth Area Army in Taiwan. The 10th Area Army was essentially the "Taiwan Army", as it had no additional combat forces assigned to it, and served as a garrison force for the island. Ando became the final Japanese Governor-General of Taiwan on 30 December 1944. After the end of the war, the 10th Area Army was disbanded in September 1945.

Arrested by Chinese authorities and charged with war crimes from his tenure in China, Andō committed suicide by taking poison while in prison in Shanghai before he could go to trial.

See also
 Taiwan under Japanese rule

References

Books

Notes

External links

 
 
 
 

1884 births
1946 suicides
Military personnel from Miyagi Prefecture
Japanese generals
Governors-General of Taiwan
Imperial Japanese Army generals of World War II
Imperial Japanese Army personnel of World War II
Japanese military personnel who committed suicide
Suicides in the Republic of China
Suicides by poison
People who committed suicide in prison custody
Drug-related suicides in China
Prisoners who died in Chinese detention